Ranchi–Kamakhya Express is an Express train of the Indian Railways connecting  in Jharkhand and   in Assam. It is currently being operated with 15661/15662 train numbers once in week basis. The train passes through Jharkhand, Bihar, West Bengal and Assam.

Service

The 15661/Ranchi–Kamakhya Express has an average speed of 44 km/hr and covers 1191 km in 27 hrs. 15662/Kamakhya–Ranchi Express has an average speed of 45 km/hr and covers 1191 km in 26 hrs 25 mins.

Route and halts 

The important halts of the train are :

JHARKHAND
  (Starts)
 
 
 Chandrapura 
 Dhanbad
 Pakur railway station

WEST BENGAL
 
 
 
 
 
 New Farakka Junction
 
 
 
 Malbazar Junction
 Binnaguri Junction
 Hasimara Railway Station
 

BIHAR
 Barsoi
 Kishanganj

ASSAM
 
 
 Goalpara
  (Ends)

Traction

Coach composition

The train consists of 22 coaches:

 1 AC II Tier coach
 10 Sleeper coaches
 4 General coaches 
 2 Second-class Luggage/parcel van

The train doesn't have Pantry Car Coach, but On board Catering services and E-Catering Services are available.

References

External links 

15661/Ranchi - Kamakhya Express India Rail Info
15662/Kamakhya - Ranchi Express India Rail Info

Transport in Ranchi
Transport in Guwahati
Express trains in India
Rail transport in Assam
Rail transport in West Bengal
Rail transport in Jharkhand